KLSM (104.5 FM, "K-Hits 104.5") is a radio station licensed to Tallulah, Louisiana. The station broadcasts a Top 40 (CHR) format in the Vicksburg area and is owned by Holladay Broadcasting of Louisiana, LLC.

References

External links 

 KLSM's official website

Radio stations in Louisiana
Contemporary hit radio stations in the United States
Radio stations established in 1982